Joyce Coad (April 14, 1917 – May 3, 1987) was a child actress in motion pictures.

Child prodigy
Coad was the survivor of triplets whose parents died shortly after she was born. She was adopted by a childless couple and taken to Los Angeles, California. Her foster father was Raymond E. Coad. By the age of five she became a reader of children's stories on radio station KHJ in Los Angeles with the Beacon Light Company. It was commented that Coad's genius was first observed when she began to commit to memory songs, speeches, and music she heard over the radio.

Film actress
Coad moved to Los Angeles at the same time in 1926 that Metro Goldwyn Mayer was searching for a "million dollar baby". She won the contest conducted by the Los Angeles Evening Express and was brought to Hollywood to play the leading role in Hearts In Dixie. She was selected from among one thousand youngsters to play a part in The Devil's Circus (1926) directed by Benjamin Christensen. Coad played the role of Little Anita. She also received a contract to perform on radio station KNX in Hollywood. Her programs included recitations, songs, and stories.

She performed the role of Pearl in The Scarlet Letter (1926), a film which featured Lillian Gish. Louis B. Mayer chose Victor Seastrom to direct the movie. He proved a fine choice because of his attentiveness to characterization. Drums of Love (1928), directed by D.W. Griffith, is set in the middle of the nineteenth century in South America. Coad appeared in the role of the little sister in a screen production which starred Lionel Barrymore, Don Alvarado, and Tully Marshall.

The number of her film appearances declined after 1931. She played the role of Elsa The German Milkmaid in Captured! (1933). In June 1937 Coad was cast in The Deerslayer, which was being filmed by Standard Pictures. She was twenty years old.

Death
Joyce Coad died at March Air Force Base, Riverside County, California in 1987, aged 70, from undisclosed causes.

Select filmography

References

External links

Joyce Coad photo from silentsaregolden.com, retrieved 2-13-08.

1917 births
1987 deaths
American child actresses
American film actresses
American silent film actresses
Actresses from Wyoming
People from Laramie, Wyoming
20th-century American actresses